The National Board of Physician Nutrition Specialists (NBPNS) is a nonprofit organization that certifies physicians practicing nutrition medicine. Established in 1997, NBPNS maintains credentialing standards, examination assessments, and offers certification for physician nutrition specialists. Eligibility requires completion of a recognized nutrition fellowship program, sufficient continuing medical education (CME), or comparable training. The NBPNS is affiliated with the American Society for Nutrition. Member societies include: the American Society for Parenteral and Enteral Nutrition, the American Association of Clinical Endocrinologists, American Society for Clinical Nutrition, North American Association for the Study of Obesity, American College of Nutrition, American Gastroenterological Association, and the Canadian Society for Clinical Nutrition.

History
The National Board of Physician Nutrition Specialists was founded in 1997 by a coalition of nutrition societies called the Intersociety Professional Nutrition Education Consortium (IPNEC). In 2001, nutrition fellowship programs were established.

Fellowship programs
Several fellowships are offered, which result in eligibility for board certification. Fellowships are offered at the following institutions:
 Boston University
 Brigham and Women’s Hospital
 Children’s Hospital of Philadelphia
 Cleveland Clinic
 Clinical Fellowship in Clinical Nutrition and Bariatric Medicine
 Columbia University Medical Center
 Geisinger Health System
 Massachusetts General Hospital
 Memorial-Sloan Kettering Cancer Center
 University of California at Los Angeles
 University of Chicago
 University of Colorado

See also
 American Board of Medical Specialties
 American Board of Obesity Medicine

References

External links

Internal medicine
Medical associations based in the United States
Organizations established in 2011